Frederick Simms may refer to:

 Frederick Richard Simms (1863–1944), British engineer and businessman
 Frederick Walter Simms (1803–1865), British civil engineer
 Fred Simms (1929–1997), Australian rules footballer